This is a genealogical tree of the leaders of the Fujiwara clan from 669 to 1871, who were otherwise known as the .

The title, Tōshi no Chōja, was abolished with Sesshō and Kampaku during the Meiji Restoration; the family leaders from five main branches of the clan, known as the Five regent houses, were then respectively granted with hereditary peerage titles (the kazoku) until the abolition of the nobility titles under the new constitution in 1946.

Family Tree

See also
 Japanese imperial family tree
 Fujiwara clan
 Five regent houses
 List of Kuge families

Notes

References

Family trees
Fujiwara clan
Royal families